The 2010 Siemens Open singles competition was a Singles tennis tournament hosted in Scheveningen, Netherlands. It was part of the wider 2010 Siemens Open, sponsored by Siemens.

Kristof Vliegen was the defending champion; however, he chose to not play that year. Denis Gremelmayr defeated Thomas Schoorel in the final 7–5, 6–4. The winner received a prize of €6,150 out of a total prize pool of €42,500. There were eight seeded players and six players who qualified through a qualifying competition, including two as lucky losers.

Seeds

Prizes

Draw

Finals

Top half

Bottom half

References

Siemens Open - Singles
2010 Singles